

BMX racing
 April 18 – September 27: 2014 UCI BMX Supercross World Cup
 April 18 & 19 in  Manchester
 Men's Elite winner:  Liam Phillips
 Women's Elite winner:  Caroline Buchanan
 May 10 & 11 in  Papendal
 Men's Elite winner:  Sam Willoughby
 Women's Elite winner:  Laura Smulders
 June 13 & 14 in  Berlin
 Men's Elite winner:  Māris Štrombergs
 Women's Elite winner:  Caroline Buchanan
 September 6 & 7 in  Santiago del Estero
 Men's Elite winner:  Māris Štrombergs
 Women's Elite winner:  Mariana Pajón
 September 26 & 27 in  Chula Vista, California (final)
 Men's Elite winner:  Sam Willoughby
 Women's Elite winner:  Mariana Pajón
 July 23–27: 2014 UCI BMX World Championships in  Rotterdam
 Men's Elite winner:  Sam Willoughby
 Women's Elite winner:  Mariana Pajón

Cyclo-cross biking
 October 20, 2013 – January 26, 2014: 2014 UCI Cyclo-cross World Cup
 October 20, 2013, at  Valkenburg
 Men's Elite winner:  Lars van der Haar
 Women's Elite winner:  Marianne Vos
 October 26, 2013, at  Tábor
 Men's Elite winner:  Lars van der Haar
 Women's Elite winner:  Katie Compton
 November 23, 2013, at  Koksijde
 Men's Elite winner:  Niels Albert
 Women's Elite winner:  Katie Compton
 December 22, 2013, at  Namur
 Men's Elite winner:  Francis Mourey
 Women's Elite winner:  Katie Compton
 December 26, 2013, at  Heusden-Zolder
 Men's Elite winner:  Lars van der Haar
 Women's Elite winner:  Katie Compton
 January 5, 2014, at  Rome
 Men's Elite winner:  Niels Albert
 Women's Elite winner:  Katie Compton
 January 26, 2014, at  Nommay
 Men's Elite winner:  Tom Meeusen
 Women's Elite winner:  Marianne Vos
 February 1 & 2: 2014 UCI Cyclo-cross World Championships at  Hoogerheide
 Men's Elite winner:  Zdeněk Štybar
 Women's Elite winner:  Marianne Vos

Mountain biking
 April 10 – August 24: 2014 UCI Mountain Bike World Cup
 April 10 – 13 in  Pietermaritzburg
 Men's XC winner:  Julien Absalon
 Men's downhill winner:  Aaron Gwin
 Women's XC winner:  Jolanda Neff
 Women's downhill winner:  Manon Carpenter
 April 24 – 27 in  Cairns
 Men's Eliminator winner:  Samuel Gaze
 Men's XC winner:  Julien Absalon
 Men's downhill winner:  Gee Atherton
 Women's Eliminator winner:  Alexandra Engen
 Women's XC winner:  Eva Lechner
 Women's downhill winner:  Rachel Atherton
 May 23 – 25 in  Nové Město na Moravě
 Men's Eliminator winner:  Miha Halzer
 Men's XC winner:  Nino Schurter
 Women's Eliminator winner:  Alexandra Engen
 Women's XC winner:  Pauline Ferrand-Prévot
 May 30 – June 1 in  Albstadt
 Men's Eliminator winner:  Fabrice Mels
 Men's XC winner:  Julien Absalon
 Women's Eliminator winner:  Kathrin Stirnemann
 Women's XC winner:  Pauline Ferrand-Prévot
 June 7 & 8 in  Fort William, Scotland (downhill only)
 Men's Downhill winner:  Troy Brosnan
 Women's Downhill winner:  Emmeline Ragot
 June 14 & 15 in  Leogang (downhill only)
 Men's Downhill winner:  Josh Bryceland
 Women's Downhill winner:  Manon Carpenter
 July 31 – August 3 in  Mont-Sainte-Anne
 Men's Eliminator winner:  Simon Gegenheimer
 Men's XC winner:  Nino Schurter
 Men's Downhill winner:  Sam Hill
 Women's Eliminator winner:  Kathrin Stirnemann
 Women's XC winner:  Jolanda Neff
 Women's Downhill winner:  Manon Carpenter
 August 7–10 in  Windham, New York
 Men's Eliminator winner:  Catriel Soto
 Men's XC winner:  Nino Schurter
 Men's Downhill winner:  Josh Bryceland
 Women's Eliminator winner:  Jenny Rissveds
 Women's XC winner:  Catharine Pendrel
 Women's Downhill winner:  Emmeline Ragot
 August 21–24 in  Méribel (final)
 Men's Eliminator winner:  Fabrice Mels
 Men's XC winner:  Nino Schurter
 Men's Downhill winner:  Sam Hill
 Women's Eliminator winner:  Linda Indergand
 Women's XC winner:  Jolanda Neff
 Women's Downhill winner:  Rachel Atherton
 June 13 & 14: 2014 4X World Championships at  Leogang
 Men's winner:  Tomáš Slavík
 Women's winner:  Katy Curd
 June 29: 2014 UCI Mountain Bike Marathon World Championships at  Pietermaritzburg
 Men's winner:  Jaroslav Kulhavý
 Women's winner:  Annika Langvad
 September 3–7: 2014 UCI Mountain Bike & Trials World Championships at  Hafjell–Lillehammer
 Men's Eliminator winner:  Fabrice Mels
 Men's XC winner:  Julien Absalon
 Men's Downhill winner:  Gee Atherton
 Women's Eliminator winner:  Kathrin Stirnemann
 Women's XC winner:  Catharine Pendrel
 Women's Downhill winner:  Manon Carpenter

Road cycling
 January 21 – October 14: 2014 UCI World Tour
 Overall winner:  Alejandro Valverde ( Movistar Team)
 March 15 – August 30: 2014 UCI Women's Road World Cup
 Overall winner:  Lizzie Armitstead ( Boels–Dolmans Cycling Team)

Grand Tour
 May 9 – June 1: 2014 Giro d'Italia
 Winner:  Nairo Quintana (first Grand Tour win)
 July 5–27: 2014 Tour de France
 Winner:  Vincenzo Nibali (won all three Grand Tour events)
 August 23 – September 14: 2014 Vuelta a España
 Winner:  Alberto Contador (third Vuelta win; winner of all three Grand Tour events since 2008)

Monuments one-day events
 January 21–26: 2014 Tour Down Under
 Winner:  Simon Gerrans; Second:  Cadel Evans; Third:  Diego Ulissi
 March 23: 2014 Milan–San Remo
 Winner:  Alexander Kristoff; Second:  Fabian Cancellara; Third:  Ben Swift
 April 6: 2014 Ronde van Vlaanderen (also called the Tour of Flanders)
 Winner:  Fabian Cancellara; Second:  Greg Van Avermaet; Third:  Sep Vanmarcke
 April 13: 2014 Paris–Roubaix
 Winner:  Niki Terpstra; Second:  John Degenkolb; Third:  Fabian Cancellara
 April 27: 2014 Liège–Bastogne–Liège
 Winner:  Simon Gerrans; Second:  Alejandro Valverde; Third:  Michał Kwiatkowski
 October 5: 2014 Giro di Lombardia
 Winner:  Dan Martin; Second:  Alejandro Valverde; Third:  Rui Costa

UCI Continental Circuits
 January 10 -: 2013–14 UCI America Tour
 January 10–19: Vuelta al Táchira en Bicicleta in 
Stages:Stage 1: Guanare to BarinasW:  Rino GasparriniStage 2: Socopó to TáribaW:  Yonatan SalinasStage 3: San Cristóbal (circuit)W:  Juan MurilloStage 4: Lobatera to Santa Cruz de MoraW:  Jhonathan CamargoStage 5 Lagunillas to La GritaW:  Jimmy BriceñoStage 6: La Fría to Coloncito (I. T. T.)W:  Andrea Dal ColStage 7: Coloncito to ColónW:  Jhonathan CamargoStage 8: Seboruco to Cerro de CristoW:  Jhonathan CamargoStage 9: El Piñal to Casa del PadreW:  Jhonathan CamargoStage 10: Rubio (circuit) to San CristóbalW:  Pedro Herrera
 General classification::  Jimmy Briceño:  Carlos Galvis:  Juan Murillo
 January 20–26: Tour de San Luis in 
Stages:Stage 1: San Luis to Villa MercedesW:  Phil GaimonStage 2: La Punta to Mirador del Potrero de los FunesW:  Julián ArredondoStage 3: Tilisarao to Juana KoslayW:  Giacomo NizzoloStage 4: El Potrero de los Funes to Alto del AmagoW:  Nairo QuintanaStage 5: San Luis (I. T. T.)W:  Adriano MaloriStage 6: Las Chacras to Villa de MerloW:  Julián ArredondoStage 7: San Luis to Terrazas del PortezueloW:  Sacha Modolo
 General classification::  Nairo Quintana:  Phil Gaimon:  Sergio Godoy 
 January 13 -: 2013–14 UCI Africa Tour
 January 13–19: La Tropicale Amissa Bongo in 
 winner:  Natnael Berhane
 January 13 -: 2014 UCI Oceania Tour
 January 29 – February 2: New Zealand Cycle Classic in 
 winner:  Michael Vink
 February 5–9: Herald Sun Tour in 
 winner:  Simon Clarke
 February 2 -: 2014 UCI Europe Tour
 February 2: G.P. Costa degli Etruschi in 
 winner:  Simone Ponzi
 February 2: Grand Prix Cycliste la Marseillaise in 
 winner:  Kenneth Vanbilsen
 February 5–9: Étoile de Bessèges in 
 winner:  Tobias Ludvigsson
 February 5 -: 2013–14 UCI Asia Tour
 February 5–8: Dubai Tour in 
 winner:  Taylor Phinney

Other
 August 17–24: 2014 Summer Youth Olympics
 Note: Boys' and girls' teams only (which includes cross-country, BMX, time trials, and road cycling all together to determine the overall Youth Olympics team winners)
 Men's Team:  ;  ;   
 Women's Team:  ;  ;   
 International Mixed Team Relay:  ;  ;  
 September 21–28: 2014 UCI Road World Championships in  Ponferrada
  won the gold medal tally.  won the overall medal tally.

Track cycling
 November 1, 2013 – January 19, 2014: 2013–14 UCI Track Cycling World Cup (Classics)
 November 1–3, 2013, in  Manchester
 Men
 Sprint winner:  Robert Förstemann
 Scratch winner:  Andreas Müller
 Omnium winner:  Jasper de Buyst
 Points Race winner:  Martyn Irvine
 Keirin winner:  François Pervis
 4 km Individual Pursuit winner:  Marco Coledan
 Team Sprint winners: 
 Team Pursuit winners: 
 Women
 Omnium winner:  Laura Trott
 Points Race winner:  Laura Brown
 Keirin winner:  Kristina Vogel
 Sprint winner:  Kristina Vogel
 3 km Individual Pursuit winner:  Joanna Rowsell
 Scratch winner:  Małgorzata Wojtyra
 Team Sprint winners: 
 Team Pursuit winners: 
 December 5–7 in  Aguascalientes
 Men
 1 km Time Trial:  François Pervis
 Keirin winner:  Matthew Crampton
 Madison winner:  David Muntaner / Albert Torres
 Omnium winner:  Luke Davison
 Sprint winner:  Matthew Glaetzer
 Scratch winner:  Owain Doull
 Team Sprint winners: 
 Team Pursuit winners: 
 Women
 Omnium winner:  Sarah Hammer
 Sprint winner:  Kristina Vogel
 500m Time Trial winner:  Anna Meares
 Keirin winner:  Kristina Vogel
 3 km Individual Pursuit winner:  Rebecca Wisiak
 Points Race winner:  Stephanie Pohl
 Team Sprint winners: 
 Team Pursuit winners: 
 January 17–19 in  Guadalajara
 Men
 Omnium winner:  Tirian McManus
 Sprint winner:  Hugo Haak
 Madison winner:  Patrick Bevin / Thomas Scully
 1 km Time Trial winner:  Scott Sunderland
 Keirin winner:  Matthijs Büchli
 4 km Individual Pursuit winner:  Jenning Huizenga
 Points Race winner:  Kirill Sveshnikov
 Team Sprint winners: 
 Team Pursuit winners: 
 Women
 Omnium winner:  Katarzyna Pawłowska
 Keirin winner:  Lee Wai Sze
 Sprint winner:  Lin Junhong
 500m Time Trial winner:  Anastasia Voynova
 Scratch winner:  DIAO Xiao Juan
 Team Sprint winners: 
 Team Pursuit winners: 
 August 7–11, 2013: 2013 UCI Juniors Track World Championships in  Glasgow
  won both the gold and overall medal tallies.
 October 6–12: 2014 UCI Track Cycling Masters World Championships in  Manchester
 Click here for the results.
 February 26 – March 2: 2014 UCI Track Cycling World Championships in  Cali
  and  won 4 gold medals each.  and  won 8 overall medals each.
 September 8–14: COPACI American Championships 2014 in  Aguascalientes
 Men's Team Pursuit winners:  (Juan Seebastan Molano, Brayan Stiven Sanchez, Arles Castro, Jonathan Restrepo)
 Men's Sprint winner:  Hersony Canelón
 Men's Team Sprint winners:  (Hersony Canelón, César Marcano, Ángel Pulgar)
 Men's Keirin winner:  Fabián Puerta
 Men's Omnium winner:  Juan Sebastián Molano
 Women's Sprint winner:  Lisandra Guerra
 Women's Team Pursuit winners:  (Jennifer Valente, Elizabeth Newell, Amber Gaffney, Kimberly Geist)
 Women's Team Sprint winners:  (Diana García, Juliana Gaviria)
 Women's Keirin winner:  Monique Sullivan
 Women's Omnium winner:  Gillian Carleton

References

 
2014 in sports
Cycle sport by year